Svanhild Salberg (3 July 1932 – 27 June 2019) was a Norwegian politician for the Centre Party. Hailing from Skatval, she was a prolific contributor to the local revue scene. She was a member of the municipal council and Nord-Trøndelag county council.

She served as a deputy representative to the Parliament of Norway from Nord-Trøndelag during the terms 1977–1981 and 1981–1985. In total, she met during 83 days of parliamentary session.

References

1932 births
2019 deaths
People from Stjørdal
Deputy members of the Storting
Centre Party (Norway) politicians
Politicians from Nord-Trøndelag
Norwegian women in politics
Women members of the Storting